Martti Hyvärinen (born 6 November 1939) is a Finnish former footballer. He played in 16 matches for the Finland national football team from 1959 to 1967.

With 119 goals in 270 games he is 10th in all time goalscorers list of Finnish premier division. During his career he won 3 Finnish championships and 1 cup title.

References

External links
 

1939 births
Living people
Finnish footballers
Finland international footballers
Place of birth missing (living people)
Association football forwards